The Confederate Memorial (also referred to as the First Confederate Memorial) at Indian Mound Cemetery in Romney, West Virginia, commemorates residents of Hampshire County who died during the American Civil War while fighting for the Confederate States of America. It was sponsored by the Confederate Memorial Association, which formally dedicated the monument on September 26, 1867. The town of Romney has claimed that this is the first memorial structure erected to memorialize the Confederate dead in the United States and that the town performed the nation's first public decoration of Confederate graves on June 1, 1866.

The idea to memorialize the Confederate war dead of Hampshire County was first discussed in the spring of 1866. Following the decoration of the graves that summer, the Confederate Memorial Association engaged in fundraising for construction of the memorial, and by 1867 the necessary funds were raised. The inscription The Daughters of Old Hampshire Erect This Tribute of Affection to Her Heroic Sons Who Fell in Defence of Southern Rights was selected, and the contract for the memorial's construction was awarded to the Gaddes Brothers firm of Baltimore. The memorial's components were delivered to Indian Mound Cemetery on September 14, 1867, and the memorial was dedicated on September 26 of that year. The construction of the Confederate Memorial marked the beginning of an era of post-war revitalization for Hampshire County following the American Civil War.

The memorial comprises a base with obelisk and capstone, standing on a raised mound. The list of 125 names engraved on the monument includes four captains, seven lieutenants (one of which was a chaplain), three sergeants, and 119 privates. The memorial underwent a restoration in 1984, and is decorated annually with a handmade evergreen garland and wreath on Hampshire County Confederate Memorial Day.

Confederate Memorial Association 

The idea to memorialize the men of Hampshire County who had died fighting in the Military of the Confederate States of America during the American Civil War was first discussed at a meeting in early spring of 1866 at the Romney residence of former Confederate Colonel Robert White. In addition to White, those present at the meeting included his brother Christian Streit White, his future sister-in-law Elizabeth "Bessie" Jane Schultze, and his sister Frances Ann White, who later married Samuel Lightfoot Flournoy.

Following the meeting, the concept gained support among other residents of Romney. Later in the spring of 1866, a group of Hampshire County women held a public meeting to organize the Confederate Memorial Association with the mission of honoring the men who had died fighting for the Confederacy and providing financial aid to their families. At this meeting, the association appointed officers, adopted a constitution, and organized committees to arrange for the decoration of Confederate interments.

The people of Hampshire County had been overwhelmingly pro-Confederate during the American Civil War, but the county now lay within Unionist West Virginia. West Virginia's first state constitution disenfranchised Confederate veterans and partisans and forbade them from holding elected office. In spite of these impediments and risking the ire of Unionist authorities, members of the Confederate Memorial Association and their families marched through Romney to Indian Mound Cemetery and formally decorated the gravestones at the interment sites of Confederate dead on June 1, 1866. Few Hampshire County residents participated in this first decoration of the Confederate graves, fearing reproach from Federal authorities; some who had pledged to take part in the decoration later refused to do so for the same reason.

This adornment in Indian Mound Cemetery has been called the first such public decoration of Confederate burials, but the claim is disputed by other towns in the Southern United States. Romney's decoration contributed to a precedent that spread throughout the South during the Reconstruction Era. Relatives and loved ones of the Union dead buried in Indian Mound Cemetery also began to follow this precedent by decorating the cemetery's Union headstones.

Fundraising 
Following the first decoration of the graves in 1866, momentum built for the erection of a permanent monument to the Confederate dead at Indian Mound Cemetery. The Confederate Memorial Association engaged in fundraising for construction of the memorial, including sewing circles, bazaars, and fairs. Confederate veterans and others in Hampshire County undertook additional fundraising efforts, including entertainment shows and general solicitation. In addition to raising funds for the construction of the memorial, the Confederate Memorial Association also raised money for the widows and children of the Confederate dead. By October 15, 1866, the gross receipts returned to the association's treasury amounted to $1,170.91 USD, of which the Confederate Memorial Association provided US$421.58 to the Confederate widows and orphaned children. Fundraising continued until June 1867.

Design selection 

By June 6, 1867, the Confederate Memorial Association had raised the necessary funds and proceeded to select the design, inviting and considering the opinions of Confederate veterans and others across Hampshire County.

In July 1867, a committee of the Confederate Memorial Association narrowed the numerous proposals it had received for the memorial's inscription to three finalists. The first inscription finalist said the Confederate soldiers "died in defense of what they believed to be right", the second said they were "our sons and brothers, who fell as soldiers in the Confederate army", and the third, which was ultimately adopted by the committee, read in full: "The Daughters of Old Hampshire Erect This Tribute of Affection to Her Heroic Sons Who Fell in Defence of Southern Rights".

Construction 
Once the design and inscription had been chosen, the association appointed committees to select a contractor. At the end of the process, the contract was awarded to the Gaddes Brothers firm of Baltimore. They were asked to fabricate a white Italian marble monument. The memorial was designed, sculpted, and manufactured at a cost of US$1,133.63. According to United Daughters of the Confederacy historian Mary Bell Foote, the words "Southern Rights" were initially omitted from the end of the memorial's inscription during its fabrication due to the "bitter feelings at the time" following the American Civil War, and Federal statutes banning such monuments. After the memorial's components were packaged for shipping to Romney, the words "Southern Rights" were secretly etched into the white marble and the components quickly boarded over and shipped.

The memorial's components were delivered to Indian Mound Cemetery on September 14, 1867, and it was erected at its present location by a group of Romney volunteers. Bob Fisher was paid US$5.00 for raising the earthen mound around the monument's location and US$4.11 for providing lodging to one of the Gaddes brothers at his residence. William Sheetz was paid US$18.80 for building the memorial's raised mound and supporting foundation. Twelve days later on September 26, the Confederate Memorial was formally dedicated in a public ceremony.

Location and design 

The Confederate Memorial stands upon a raised mound ringed by five boxwoods within the original section of Indian Mound Cemetery, not far from the cemetery's entrance. Several family interment plots surround the memorial and its circular raised lawn. A burial ground where Confederate and Union dead were buried during the American Civil War lies adjacent to the memorial.

The structure's pedestal consists of two major stylized blocks of white marble, topped by a sculpture of a cloth draped urn. Carved into the façade of the smaller top block of the memorial is a high relief that represents either Fame or an angel placing a laurel wreath upon the head of a dying soldier clasping his sword. Below, on the façade of the larger block, is the inscription: "The Daughters of Old Hampshire Erect This Tribute of Affection to Her Heroic Sons Who Fell in Defence of Southern Rights." The other three sides of the memorial contain the engraved names of 125 Hampshire County men who died for the Confederate cause. A number representing the total fallen Confederates was not included in the memorial as it was not precisely known at the time of the monument's construction. The memorial's foundation block bears the date of its erection, "1867".

Inscribed names 
The list of 125 names engraved on the monument consists of four captains, seven lieutenants (one of which was a chaplain), three sergeants, and 119 privates. Since the memorial's erection in 1867, several names of Hampshire County's Confederate dead were found to have been omitted from the memorial. These names have been included in the "Confederate Honor Roll" along with those names etched in the memorial and the names of Confederate veterans. Each of these names is recited during the annual ceremony held on Hampshire County Confederate Memorial Day. The following is the list of Confederate dead etched into the Confederate Memorial:

Restoration 
In 1984, the Confederate Memorial underwent an extensive restoration. The monument had darkened due to weathering. The surfaces of the memorial were sanded and sealed for future protection. This restoration effort was funded through charitable contributions. The names of the contributors were inscribed within the same treasurer's book used to record the memorial's inaugural contributions on June 6, 1866. The monument's restoration cost totaled US$2,850.

Hampshire County Confederate Memorial Day 

The tradition of decorating the Confederate graves in Indian Mound Cemetery has continued annually since June 1, 1866, and occurs on the first Saturday in June, which is known as Hampshire County Confederate Memorial Day or June Decoration Day. On this day, participants in the ceremony march down Main Street (U.S. Route 50) through Romney with American Civil War reenactors carrying Confederate flags. Flowers and Confederate flags are also placed at each of the Confederate headstones. The decorations are usually placed at the memorial and upon the Confederate gravestones by reenactors. Invited speakers address participants. A roll of honor is recited at the memorial, followed by a musket salute. Ceremony participants include descendants of the founding members of the Confederate Memorial Association.

Significance 

The construction of the Confederate Memorial marked the beginning of an era of post-war revitalization for Hampshire County following the American Civil War. The memorial became a symbol of the county's restored confidence. The citizens of Hampshire County worked together to reestablish and rebuild the institutions, municipal buildings, and businesses destroyed during the war. The Confederate Memorial Association that constructed the monument was a part of a larger movement throughout the post-war American South, especially in Virginia, which sought to provide suitable interments for Confederate war dead. Historian Caroline E. Janney averred that these "Ladies' Memorial Associations" used "gender in the interest of Confederate politics", which laid the groundwork for the establishment of the Lost Cause of the Confederacy belief.

The memorial is among the first monuments erected to memorialize the Confederate dead in the United States. Romney's claim to have the first Confederate Memorial is disputed by Cheraw, South Carolina, as its monument was dedicated two months prior on July 26, 1867. However, the Cheraw memorial omits the mention of "Confederacy", "Confederate", or "Southern".

Vandalism 
As part of the 2–4 June 2017 observance of Hampshire County Confederate Memorial Day and the 150th anniversary of the Confederate Memorial's construction, participants installed a tombstone, a Cross of Honor, and Confederate flags at the gravesite of African-American Alfred Whiting in nearby African-American Mount Pisgah Benevolence Cemetery. In addition, participants performed a ceremony and presentation on Whiting's Confederate service at his gravesite. However, Whiting's status as a Confederate veteran is a matter of debate among local historians. In August 2017, public debate over Confederate monuments and memorials was exacerbated by the Unite the Right rally in Charlottesville, Virginia. While this debate was centered around the placement of Confederate monuments in public spaces, the Confederate Memorial in Romney is located on private land owned by the Indian Mound Cemetery Association Board of Directors.

Between 16 and 17 September 2017, the Confederate Memorial was vandalized. The unknown perpetrators spray painted black graffiti on the monument and removed Confederate flags previously emplaced nearby the monument. Papers with vulgar language were also left behind by the perpetrators. Following the vandalism, the damaged parts of the monument were covered with cardboard and tape.

See also 
 List of historic sites in Hampshire County, West Virginia
 Romney, West Virginia, during the American Civil War
 West Virginia in the American Civil War

References 
Explanatory notes

Citations

Bibliography

External links 
 
 HistoricHampshire.org Confederate Memorial website

1867 establishments in West Virginia
1867 sculptures
Buildings and structures completed in 1867
Buildings and structures in Romney, West Virginia
Confederate States of America monuments and memorials in West Virginia
Hampshire County, West Virginia, in the American Civil War
Indian Mound Cemetery
Marble sculptures in the United States
Obelisks in the United States
Tourist attractions in Hampshire County, West Virginia
Vandalized works of art in West Virginia